Vathima are Iyers from Tamil Nadu, India. They belong to the Taittirīya Śākhā of the Krsna Yajurveda.

Geographical distribution 
Due to their geographic concentration, it is noted that they tended to be isolated and had an insular culture. They mainly reside in Tanjāvūr.

Their subcastes are Patineṭṭu Grāmattu, Udayalūr, Naṇṇilam, and Rāthāmaṅgalam.

References 

Tamil Brahmins
Social groups of Tamil Nadu